Gogulampadu is a village near Nuzvid in Krishna district, Andhra Pradesh, India. It is around 10-12 kilometres from Nuzvid.

Villages in Krishna district